Baird is a city and the county seat of Callahan County, Texas, United States. Its population was 1,496 at the 2010 census. The city is named after Matthew Baird, the owner and director of the Texas and Pacific Railway. The railway depot is now operated as the visitor center and a transportation museum.

Baird is part of the Abilene, Texas metropolitan statistical area.

Geography

Baird is located in north-central Callahan County. Interstate 20 passes through the northern part of the city, leading west  to Abilene and east  to Cisco. U.S. Route 283 crosses the east side of town, leading north  to Albany and south  to Coleman.

History
Baird, Texas was named after Matthew Baird, a director of the Texas and Pacific Railway. He was also sole proprietor of the Baldwin Locomotive Works, the largest locomotive firm in the United States, headquartered in Philadelphia, Pennsylvania.

The city was officially founded in 1880. In 1993, the Texas Legislature designated Baird as the "Antique Capital of West Texas". It has 12 antique shops.

The former Callahan County Jail, at 100 W. 5th Street, was originally located in nearby Belle Plain, then the county seat. When the county seat moved to Baird, the jail was disassembled brick by brick, and reassembled at its current location. Belle Plain lost population and became a ghost town.

The town has five churches, four gas stations, a feed store, and a small locally owned grocery store. Franchises here include a Dairy Queen, Love's truck stop, and a Dollar General. The truck stop has a Subway and a Chester's Chicken.

Library

The Callahan County Library was started in 1937 by the Baird Wednesday Club. The Pioneer Museum was added in 1940. Both are located on the basement floor of the Callahan County Courthouse. The museum features farm and ranch implements, household items, clothing, barbed wire, and documents.

Demographics

2020 census

As of the 2020 United States census, there were 1,479 people, 728 households, and 461 families residing in the city.

2000 census
As of the census of 2000,  1,623 people, 677 households, and 429 families were residing in the city. The population density was 619.0 people/sq mi (239.2/km2). The 806 housing units averaged 307.4/sq mi (118.8/km2). The racial makeup of the city was 90.51% White, 0.18% African American, 0.31% Native American, 0.80% Asian orPacific Islander, 7.09% from other races, and 1.11% from two or more races. Hispanics or Latinos of any race were 13.43% of the population.

Of the 677 households,  28.4% had children under 18 living with them, 49.6% were married couples living together, 9.3% had a female householder with no husband present, and 36.6% were not families. About 33.7% of all households were made up of individuals, and 19.8% had someone living alone who was 65 or older. The average household size was 2.32, and the average family size was 2.96.

In the city, theage distribution was 23.4% under 18, 7.3% from 18 to 24, 24.6% from 25 to 44, 24.0% from 45 to 64, and 20.8% who were 65  or older. The median age was 41 years. For every 100 females, there were 93.0 males. For every 100 females age 18 and over, there were 88.9 males.

The median income for a household in the city was $27,446, and for a family was $35,000. Males had a median income of $21,974 versus $16,298 for females. The per capita income for the city was $13,951. About 12.3% of families and 14.0% of the population were below the poverty line, including 18.4% of those under age 18 and 12.5% of those age 65 or over.

Education
The City of Baird is served by the Baird Independent School District, located at 600 West 7th Street.  Baird ISD is classified as a 1A district.

Notable people

Climate
The climate in this area is characterized by hot, humid summers and generally mild to cool winters.  According to the Köppen climate classification, Baird has a humid subtropical climate, Cfa on climate maps.

References

External links

 Baird Chamber of Commerce

Cities in Texas
Cities in Callahan County, Texas
County seats in Texas
Cities in the Abilene metropolitan area